Gemünden (Main) station is a station in the town of Gemünden am Main in the Main-Spessart district of the German state of Bavaria on the Flieden–Gemünden railway. It was opened on 1 October 1854. The station is classified by Deutsche Bahn (DB) as a category 4 station.

Station category
After the completion of the Hanover–Würzburg high-speed railway, the station, which had previously been classified as a "regional node" (category 3), was downgraded to category 5 ("local traffic stop"), of the then six categories because from that time nearly all intercity services were routed over the high speed line. Up to the timetable of 2008 there were still occasional Intercity services, but since then long-distance services have been abandoned completely.

With the reassignment of station categories on 1 January 2011 using objective and quantitative criteria, the station was reclassified as category 4 of the current seven categories.

Operations

The Gemünden train station is now served only by the following regional services (as of the 2016 timetable):

Notes

Railway stations in Bavaria
Railway stations in Germany opened in 1854
Main-Spessart
1854 establishments in Bavaria